Daisetsuzan may refer to:

 Daisetsuzan National Park, located in the mountainous center of the northern Japanese island of Hokkaidō.
 Daisetsuzan Volcanic Group, volcanic group in Hokkaidō, Japan.